Yau Tong West is one of the 37 constituencies in the Kwun Tong District of Hong Kong which was created in 2003.

The constituency has an estimated population of 19,627.

Councillors represented

Election results

2010s

References

Constituencies of Hong Kong
Constituencies of Kwun Tong District Council
2003 establishments in Hong Kong
Constituencies established in 2003
Yau Tong